The Fort of the Açougue, ruins of a 16th-century fortification located in the municipality of Angra do Heroísmo, along the southern coast of Terceira, Portuguese archipelago of the Azores.

History
Its construction remotes from the Portuguese succession crisis of 1580, sometime between 1579 and 1581, when attacks by pirates in the mid-Atlantic threatened the safety and security of New World treasure ships. The Corregedor of the Azores, Ciprião de Figueiredo e Vasconcelos initiated the construction of several forts that ringed the coasts of Terceira, using the plans of Italian military engineer Tommaso Benedetto as its basis.

The chronicler Gaspar Frutuoso referred to this fortification in the explanations in his Saudades da Terra, sometime in the 16th century:
"At the fort called Açougue: [there are] Two pieces of strained iron, of 10 quintais and 30 arráteis; another piece of iron of 9 quintais [] and 20 arráteis []; two of bronze of 140 arráteis [], with crowns and crescent moons; 115 projectile of lead with lead bullets pear the grinders, ten...projectiles, twelve alcanzias [hand-thrown grenades]."

Architecture
By the end of the 20th century there little more than ruins of this fortification, nor the remains of its foundations.

References 
Notes

Sources
 
 
 

Fort Acougue
Acougue